Manfred Moch (15 May 1930 – 28 May 2011) was a German trumpet player. He made a name for himself in the 1960s as the featured solo trumpet player for the Bert Kaempfert orchestra, contributing memorable and melodic solos to many of Kaempfert’s hits; such songs included “Bye Bye Blues”, “Strangers In The Night”, “L-O-V-E” and “Sweet Maria”. His association with Kaempfert ended in 1968 over a pay dispute, but by the late 1970s he was again playing sessions and concerts with Kaempfert, although not as a soloist. Moch was also a long-time member of the James Last Orchestra during the 1960s and 1970s, and continued to play for Last as a session musician after leaving the touring band. In addition, Moch was a member of the NDR (Nordeutscher Rundfunk, or North German Radio) Big Band from the 1960s until the 1990s. He was also active as a session player in Hamburg, playing for many other popular German recording artists. During the late 1960s, Moch recorded some trumpet duet albums with fellow Last/Kaempfert bandmate Heinz Habermann, which were released on the Decca label under the name The Tattoos.
Moch died on 28 May 2011.

References

External links
1967 Kaempfert medley featuring Moch

German male musicians
German trumpeters
Male trumpeters
German session musicians
2011 deaths
1930 births
People from Jelenia Góra
People from the Province of Silesia